Garth Weiser (born 1979) is an artist based in New York City.

Weiser was born in Montana.  He makes paintings which mix stark geometric patterns with textured paint surfaces.  His work is a mixture of figurative and abstract imagery and references art and design from the 1980s and 1990s.

Weiser received his MFA from Columbia University School of the Arts in 2005, after receiving his BFA from Cooper Union. He is currently married to artist Francesca DiMattio.

Notable exhibitions

2002
Native, The House Gallery, Miami
Collector's Choice, The Nelson Fine Art Museum, Tempe
2003
New Paintings, Coos Bay Art Museum, Oregon
2004
And One For Grandma, Capsule Gallery, New York
2005
Folk Machine, Guild & Greyshkul, New York
Greater New York, PS1 MoMA, Long Island City
2006
Jessica Stockholder - Jedediah Caesar - Markus Amm - Garth Weiser, Galerie Nathalie Obadia, Paris
The Manhattan Project, Frederic Snitzer Gallery, Miami
The Difficult Shape of Possible Images, ZieherSmith, New York
2007
Blackberrying, Galleri Christina Wilson, Copenhagen
2009
Solo exhibition, Casey Kaplan gallery, New York
2011
Solo exhibition, Casey Kaplan, New York

References

External links
More information from the VoltaShow.com
Garth Weiser on ArtFacts.net
Further information from the Saatchi Gallery

Living people
1979 births
Columbia University School of the Arts alumni
Artists from Montana
Painters from New York (state)
Cooper Union alumni